Remsen Township is a township in Plymouth County, Iowa in the United States.

The elevation of Remsen Township is listed as 1440 feet above mean sea level.

References

Townships in Iowa